The 2017 WAC women's basketball tournament is a basketball tournament held on March 9–12, 2017, at the Orleans Arena in Paradise, Nevada. The #1 seed in the tournament received a first round bye to the semifinals. Grand Canyon did not compete in the 2017 women's basketball tournament. As a D2 to D1 transitioning school, they are ineligible to compete in the NCAA tournament until the 2018 season, so they could not win the conference tournament since the winner receives an automatic bid to the NCAA Tournament. However Grand Canyon was eligible to win the regular season title and is eligible to compete in the WNIT or WBI should they be invited. The winner of the WAC Tournament earned an automatic trip to the 2017 NCAA tournament.

Seeds

Schedule

Bracket

See also
 2017 WAC men's basketball tournament

References

2016–17 Western Athletic Conference women's basketball season
WAC women's basketball tournament
WAC women's basketball tournament
Basketball competitions in the Las Vegas Valley
21st century in Las Vegas
College basketball tournaments in Nevada
Women's sports in Nevada
College sports tournaments in Nevada